A vampire is a being from folklore who subsists by feeding on the life essence of the living.

Vampire or Vampyre may also refer to:

Arts and entertainment

Fictional entities 

 Vampire (Marvel Comics), including a list of vampires in the Marvel universe
 Vampire (Buffy the Vampire Slayer), in the fictional world of the TV series 
 Vampire (Doctor Who), several characters
 Vampire (Dungeons & Dragons), in the fantasy role-playing game
 Vampire (Twilight), several characters
 Vampire (Underworld), several characters

Literature 

 Vampire: Netherworld, a 1995 novel by Richard Lee Byers
 The Vampyre, an 1819 short novel by John William Polidori
 Vampires (novel), by John Steakley, 1991
 The Vampires (manga), by Osamu Tezuka, 1966
 Vampires: The World of the Undead, a 1993 non-fiction book by Jean Marigny
 Vampire: The Masquerade (Vault Comics), a monthly horror comic book

Film and television 

 Les Vampires, a 1915–16 French silent crime serial film
 The Vampire (1915 film), an American silent drama film
 Vampyr, a 1932 German horror film 
 Vampyres (film), a 1974 British horror film
 Vampire (1979 film), an American made-for-television horror film 
 Vampires (1986 film), or Abandon, a horror film 
 Vampires (1998 film), a film adaptation of the novel Vampires 
 Vampire, a 2010 horror-thriller drama film by Jon Cunningham starring Jason Carter
 Vampire (2011 film), a horror-thriller drama by Shunji Iwai
 Vampire (2021 film), a European arthouse horror film

Gaming 
 Vampire: The Dark Ages, a tabletop role-playing game 
 Vampire: The Eternal Struggle, a collectible card game
 Vampire: The Masquerade, a  tabletop roleplaying game 
 Vampire: The Requiem, a roleplaying game 
 Darkstalkers, known as Vampire in Japan, a fighting game series and media franchise
Vampire: Darkstalkers Collection, 2005
 The Sims 4: Vampires, a 2017 game pack
 Vampyr (video game), 2018

Music 
 Vampire (album), by 9mm Parabellum Bullet, 2008
 Vampyre (album), by Midnight Syndicate, 2008
 "Vampire" (2 Chainz song), 2020
 "Vampire" (Dominic Fike song), 2020
 "Vampire" (Iz*One song), 2019
 Vampires (soundtrack), for the 1998 film
 "Vampires", a song by Pet Shop Boys from the 1999 album Nightlife
 "Vampires" (Godsmack song), 2000
 "Vampires" (Dukes song), 2009
 "Vampires", a song by Gucci Mane on the 2010 album The Appeal: Georgia's Most Wanted

Roller coasters 
 Vampire (roller coaster), at Chessington World of Adventures, England
 Vampire (Walibi Belgium)
 Le Vampire, at La Ronde amusement park in Montreal, Quebec, Canada

Other uses in arts and entertainment 
 Vampire (Edvard Munch), or Love and Pain, a painting

Transportation 
 Vampire (car), a jet-propelled car, holder of the British land speed record
 HMAS Vampire, the name of two Australian ships
 HMS Vampire, the name of two British ships
 de Havilland Vampire, a British jet fighter aircraft
 Flying Machines FM250 Vampire, a Czech light aircraft
 Vickers Vampire, a British single-seat pusher biplane fighter
 "Vampire", a variant of Land Rover 101 Forward Control for electronic warfare

Biology 
 Vampire bat, a bat that feeds on blood
 Vampire fish (disambiguation), several uses
 Vampire ground finch, a bird that occasionally feeds on blood
 Vampire squid, a small deep-sea creature
 Large flying fox, Pteropus vampyrus

Other uses 
 Vampire (theorem prover), an automated theorem prover for first-order classical logic
 El Vampiro (Spanish, 'the Vampire'), nickname of Chilean tennis player Nicolás Massú
 Zielgerät 1229, code name Vampir, an infra-red device for a German assault rifle
 RPG-29 "Vampir", a Russian rocket-propelled grenade launcher
 Vampire, multiservice tactical brevity code for hostile anti-ship missile

See also 

 Dhampir, in Balkans folklore
 The Vampire (disambiguation)
 Vampiro (disambiguation)
 Vampire dugout, a First World War underground shelter in Belgium
 Vampire lifestyle, a modern alternative lifestyle
 Vampire number, in number theory
 Vampire power or standby power, the electric power consumed when in standby mode
 Vampire tap, a device for physically connecting a station to a network
 Psychic vampire, a creature in folklore